Brunneria subaptera, common name small-winged stick mantis, is a species of praying mantis found in Argentina, Bolivia, Brazil, Paraguay, and Venezuela.

See also
List of mantis genera and species

References

S
Mantodea of South America
Insects of Brazil
Arthropods of Argentina
Invertebrates of Bolivia
Invertebrates of Paraguay
Invertebrates of Venezuela
Insects described in 1869